Heydornia is a genus of parasitic alveolates in the phylum Apicomplexa.

History
This genus was created in 2016 by splitting canid-infecting species from Hammondia based on the molecular phylogenetic analysis.

Life cycle

The species in this genus have two vertebrate hosts in their life cycle: a canid (the definitive host) and prey species (the intermediate host). They are strictly heteroxenous.

References 

Apicomplexa genera
Conoidasida